Metavolcanic Mountain is a large flat-topped mountain rising to  some  north of the Hatcher Bluffs on the east side of Reedy Glacier, Antarctica. Composed of dark metavolcanic rock, this mountain contrasts with lighter-colored granites elsewhere along the glacier. It was mapped by the United States Geological Survey from surveys and U.S. Navy aerial photographs, 1960–64; the name was suggested by geologist J.H. Mercer of the Institute of Polar Studies, Ohio State University, following field work in the vicinity.

See also
Morales Peak rises from the southern part of Metavolcanic Mountain
Mount Pool rises from the northwest side of Metavolcanic Mountain

References

External links

Mountains of Marie Byrd Land